Pisoniella is a monotypic genus of flowering plants belonging to the family Nyctaginaceae. It only contains one known species, Pisoniella arborescens 

It is native to (northwestern) Argentina, Bolivia and Mexico.
 
The genus name of Pisoniella is in honour of Willem Piso (1611–1678), a Dutch physician and naturalist who participated as an expedition doctor in Dutch Brazil from 1637 – 1644. The Latin specific epithet of arborescens refers to arboreus meaning	tree-like.
Both the genus and the species were first described and published in Contr. U.S. Natl. Herb. Vol.13 on page 385 in 1911.

it has one known subspecies; Pisoniella arborescens var. glabrata  from Bolivia and northwestern Argentina.

References

Nyctaginaceae
Caryophyllales genera
Plants described in 1911
Flora of Bolivia
Flora of Mexico
Flora of Northwest Argentina